The Steele Burnand Anza-Borrego Desert Research Center is a research center at the Anza-Borrego Desert State Park in southern California. The facility is a spawn of the joint partnership between the University of California, Irvine, the Anza-Borrego Foundation, and the administration of the state park. UC Irvine originally had facilities on 3.75 acres of land in the area, and their reach was expanded by a 75-acre donation from the Anza-Borrego Foundation. The facility was formerly a country club. The complex includes a hall, two classrooms, a laboratory, and a kitchen. The area in which the facility is located receives 5-7 inches of rain per year.

References

Anza-Borrego Desert State Park
Research institutes in California
San Diego County, California
University of California, Irvine